Miodrag "Mijo" Kadija (born 27 September 1962) is a Montenegrin basketball coach of Spars Ilidža of the Basketball Championship of Bosnia and Herzegovina and the ABA League Second Division.

Coaching career 
Kadija coached Lovćen Cetinje, Budućnost, Atlas, Avala Ada, Sloga, Igokea, Strumica, Feni Industries, Teodo Tivat.

On 23 August 2018, Kadija became a head coach for the Montenegrin team Lovćen 1947 for the third time. He left after the 2018–19 season ended.

On 2 January 2021, Bosnian team Spars hired Kadija as their new head coach. He left Spars after the 2020–21 season ended. On 31 December 2021, he re-signed with Spars.

National teams coaching career
Kadija was the head coach of the Serbia & Montenegro U16 national team that won the gold medal at the 2003 European Championship for Cadets in Madrid, Spain. He also coached National under-18 team at the 2004 FIBA Europe Under-18 Championship in Spain.

Kadija was the head coach of the Montenegro U18 national team.

References

External links 
 Coach Profile at eurobasket.com

1962 births
Living people
KK Avala Ada coaches
KK Budućnost coaches
KK Igokea coaches
KK Lovćen coaches
KK Sloga coaches
OKK Spars coaches
KK Teodo Tivat coaches
Montenegrin basketball coaches
Montenegrin expatriate basketball people in Serbia
Sportspeople from Cetinje